The Institute for Studies in Industrial Development (ISID), formerly Corporate Studies Group, is a seat of higher learning, formed by under the umbrella of the Indian Council of Social Science Research, by the Government of India with an aim to assist the government in formulating national level policies. The Institute is located in Vasant Kunj, New Delhi, India and is headed by Padma Vibhushan winner, T. N. Chaturvedi.

Profile 
The Institute for Studies in Industrial Development (ISID) was started in the eighties, when the Indian Council of Social Science Research (ICSSR) revamped the erstwhile Corporate Studies Group (CSG) by expanding the mandate to make the institute, a nodal agency in matters related to industrial policy development in India. It is a public funded, non profitable organization and acts as an advisory body to ICSSR.

The activities of the Institute is broadly classified into various themes.

Facilities

ISID Campus

ISID activities are housed at three main buildings, Academic Block, Office Block and Conference Block, extending to approximately 200,000 sq. ft, sitting on a land with an extent of 1.5 hectares, in the Institutional Area of Vasant Kunj, in New Delhi. The campus is home to:
 A library
 Faculty rooms
 Conference and lecture halls
 A guest house
 A pantry, dining hall and cafeteria
 An auditorium

It also holds recreational facilities for the staff and faculty of the institute.

Library

The Library stocks an extensive collection of books, journals and reports in subjects such as industrial economics, foreign investment, employment and labour, media and corporate sector, including publications of GATT/WTO, Reserve Bank of India, World Bank, UNCTAD, CMIE (EIS), NSSO and CSO. Some other notable collections are:
 Bombay Stock Exchange Official Directory
 Publications of Department of Company Affairs
 Dun & Bradstreet’s Who Owns Whom
 Jane's Major Companies of Europe
 Handbook of Economics Series (59 volumes—view list)
 The New Palgrave Dictionary of Economics (8 volumes)
 Encyclopaedia of Cities and Towns (27 volumes)
 United Nations Library on Transnational Corporations (20 volumes)

It also stocks reports, policy statements, committee reports, plan documents, statistical sources, government acts, rules and guidelines and a collection of prospectuses of more than 6,000 companies. ISID Library maintains a digital database of CDs, films and online repository as well. It also subscribes to several journals and magazines.

The users of the library have access to JSTOR database, Elsevier Science Direct—Economics, Business and Finance, EconLit Full Text, Wiley-Blackwell Social Science and Humanities, CMIE Prowess, EPWRF On-line Data Series - 13 modules, SANSCO online annual reports and IMF e-library Statistics. It also provides user services such as reference queries, referrals, reprographics and inter-library loan.

Research Reference CD (RRCD)

ISID offers online referencing assistance and in addition to that, has released a reference database on the subject in CD format, under the name, ISID Research Reference CD which contains index to articles, discussion notes, editorials, Union Budget Speeches, Sections of Economic Survey, key statistics on the Indian economy, Global Development Indicators, reports and website addresses of institutions and scientists.

Projects
ISID has carried out several important projects for the Government of India.

 Ports as Infrastructure, Ports as Cities: The Indian Port System from Colonialism to Globalization
 Regulating FDI in MBRT: Some Key Concerns
 Ports as Infrastructure, Ports as Cities: The Indian Port System from Colonialism to Globalization
 A Multi-dimensional Study of Imperial Order and its Journey towards Neo-liberal Imperialism under Globalisation
 ISID-PHFI Collaborative Research in Public Health (2013-2015)
 Crony Capitalism and Contemporary India 
 Survey of Corporate Governance in India 
 Internationalization Process of Indian Pharmaceutical Industry
 Indian Multinationals in Global Economy
 Changing Pattern of Corporate Ownership and Implications for Monitoring Company Managements

Publications
 
 
 
 
 
 
 
 

 
 
 
 
 
 

 
 
 
 
 
 
 
 
 

ISID also offers full text downloading facility of select research studies on the Internet.

See also

 Deindustrialisation
 Division of labour
 Great Divergence
 Idea of Progress
 Newly industrialised country
 Urbanisation

References

External links

Organisations based in Delhi
Research institutes in Delhi
Political and economic think tanks based in India